NVDES is an experimental indie pop, indietronica, and electropop project based in Los Angeles, California. Founded by Josh Ocean in 2015, NVDES has released several singles and a visual album, Vibe City Utah (2018).

Song Usage
NVDES was dubbed "Apple's unofficial house band," after the band was featured in various Apple commercials over the years. 

The song "D.Y.T. (Do Your Thing)", featuring Remmi, was featured in an iPhone X commercial in January 2018. In 2019, the song "Brazooka" was featured in the iPhone 11 commercial, and in April 2020, the song "Purusha" was featured in the iPhone SE commercial. 

The song "Ou La La La (All Eyes On Us)" was also featured in a 2020 MIRROR by Lululemon commercial.

Discography

Albums
 Vibe City Utah (2018)
 Nvdity Worldwide (2020)

EPs
 Life with Lobsters (2016)
 La NVDITÉ, Vol. 1 (2016)
 Vol. 2 (2017)

Singles
 "Before the Weekend Comes" (2015)
 "Unforgettable" (2015)
 "Fela" (2015)
 "Don't Fvck Your Neighbor" (2016)
 "The Other Side" 7", B3SCI Records (2016)
 "Can You Not" (2016)
 "8am" (2016)
 "My Mind Is" featuring Oliver Tree (2016)
 "Turning Heads" (2017)
 "Do You Think About Me" (2017)
 "D.Y.T. (Do Your Thing)" with Remmi (2017)
 "Louì" (2018)
 "Anything Goes" (2018)

Features
 "Better Places" by Pierce Fulton (2017)

References

External links
 Official site

Indietronica music groups
Electronic music groups from California
2015 establishments in California
Musical groups established in 2015